The Latvian Figure Skating Championships are a competition held annually to crown the national champions of Latvia. Medals may be awarded in men's singles, ladies' singles, pair skating, and ice dancing.

In the 2011–12 season, the championships were held as an open international competition. In the 2016–17 season, a combined Latvian-Lithuanian event was organized. The results were then separated to form national podiums.

Medalists

Men

Ladies

Pairs

Ice dance

Junior medalists

Men

Ladies

Advanced novice medalists

Men

Ladies

References

External links
 Skate Latvia
 results

 
Figure skating national championships
Figure skating in Latvia